Joannis is a given name. Notable people with the name include:

 Joannis Andreou, Greek swimmer
 Joannis Antonius de Sancto Giorgio, Italian jurist
 Joannis Avramidis, Greek-Austrian sculptor
 Joannis Capodistrias, Greek politician in Russia
 Joannis de Segovia, Spanish theologian
 Joannis Eschuid, English astrologer
 Joannis Melissanidis, Greek artistic gymnast
 Joannis Metaxas, Greek politician
 Joannis Phrangoudis, Greek Army officer
 Joannis Romberch de Kyrspe, Westphalia
 Joannis Vislicensis, medieval author
 Joanni Perronet, French fencer
 Andreas Eudaemon-Joannis, Greek Jesuit and philosopher
 Giovanni Giorgi (composer) (Joannis de Georgiis), Italian composer and priest
 Giovanni Maria Alemanni, Italian composer and lutenist
 Jan Weenix, Dutch painter
 Jan z Lublina, Polish composer and organist
 Jens Nilssøn (Joannis Nicolai), Bishop of Oslo
 Johann Hedwig, German botanist
 John Martyn (botanist), English botanist

as a surname
Joseph de Joannis (1864–1932), French clergyman and amateur entomologist

See also
 
 Johannis (disambiguation)
 Iohannis
 Ioannis
 Alternate forms for the name John